Śródka  is a village in the administrative district of Gmina Chrzypsko Wielkie, within Międzychód County, Greater Poland Voivodeship, in west-central Poland.

Geographical location
The village is situated in an attractive part of Gmina Chrzypsko Wielkie, between three lakes: Wielkie (262 ha), Kuchenne (63 ha), Liśnia (19 ha).

Śródka is placed in area of Sieraków Landscape Park and in area of Natura 2000.

History
Śródka was a private village of the Polish nobility, including the Pawłowski and Kurnatowski families, administratively located in the Poznań County in the Poznań Voivodeship in the Greater Poland Province of the Kingdom of Poland.

References

Populated lakeshore places in Poland
Villages in Międzychód County